Carolyn Stotesbery-Levens (née Stotesbery) is an American actress, writer, and producer best known for portraying the character Pamela Richardson on the TNT drama Agent X and her acting roles in Grey Lady and Castle.

Early life 

Stotesbery was born in Wayzata, a suburb of Minneapolis, Minnesota, where she lived part-time as well as spending summers on a cattle ranch in Big Timber, Montana. She is the daughter of Anne and Patrick Stotesbery. Her father was a cattle rancher, but traded the cattle business for cabernet by moving from their Montana ranching community to Napa Valley to create Ladera Vineyards, which has flourished into a coveted label.

Stotesbery is the youngest of 4 children; she has an older brother, Dan, and 2 older sisters, Nicole and Laura. Stotesbery attended Breck School and Wayzata public school before attending USC. She began acting at the age of 5, and at the age of 8 became a part of the Children's Theater of Minneapolis.  In high school, Stotesbery was cast in multiple musical theater productions as well as plays, including Into The Woods, West Side Story, and Noises Off.

Stotesbery studied Shakespeare at Cambridge University in England, and New York University (NYU) Tisch Stella Adler Conservatory, as well as Theater at USC.

Stotesbery is an Improv Olympic West Alumni and a member of UCB. She also spent time at the Second City Training Center and The Groundlings.

Acting career 

In 2003, Stotesbery made her first appearance in a Hollywood film with a small role in the Farrelly brothers’ Stuck On You, opposite Greg Kinnear and Matt Damon.  Before that she had appeared in the hit comedic show MTV's Undressed.

Stotesbery subsequently played opposite Jason Schwartzman in the FOX pilot Cracking Up created by Mike White and portrayed Johanna Hoffman, a Dutch Jew that survived the Holocaust in CBS’s award-winning, Emmy nominated show Cold Case with Kathryn Morris. In 2006, she appeared in the independent film Bobby directed by Emilio Estevez.

In the 2010s, Stotesbery appeared in Glory Daze from Van Wilder director Walt Becker on TBS and Treasure of the Black Jaguar, as well as the independent film Crosshairs directed by Nick Lentz, which also starred Tom Sizemore. She starred as one of the leads in the pilot Olympia, which did very well in the festival circuit and won 5 awards.  She later reunited with director Nick Lentz and starred in the French comedic short film Cupcakes. Stotesbery also starred in the dramatic short film Cold Feet and the music video for Adele’s Don't you remember.

In 2015, Stotesbery played the role of Pamela Richardson on the TNT series Agent X starring Sharon Stone, Jeff Hephner, Jamey Sheridan, John Shea and Mike Colter.

Following Agent X, Stotesbery went on to appear in episodes of Castle and the feature film 
Grey Lady released in mid-2017. In 2019 she was hired to write a television series, Menace of Venice for Todd Garner's Broken Road Productions along with her husband, Philip Levens.

Modeling
As a freshman in high school, Stotesbery was chosen 1 out of 400 girls in the Ford Modeling search to represent Beauty in the Midwest. Stotesbery was selected to go to New York and featured on CBS after which, Ford placed her in Chicago where at 15 she lived on her own working as a model.  She has shot with top photographers Ellen Von Unwerth, Odette Sugerman, Jill Greenberg, Jeremy Goldberg, Peggy Sirota, Andrew Southam, Bonnie Holland, and Jason Nocito, appearing in such magazines as Italian Vogue, Rolling Stone, Glamour, and Allure.

Personal life
Stotesbery is married to screenwriter Philip Levens. 

 The couple lives in Los Angeles.

Filmography

Television

Theatre credits

References

External links 
 
 Official Website of Carolyn Stotesbery

Living people
Year of birth missing (living people)
American film actresses
American television actresses
American stage actresses
21st-century American actresses
People from Wayzata, Minnesota
People from Big Timber, Montana